Serdar Deliktaş (born 4 August 1986) is a Turkish footballer who plays as a forward for TFF Second League club Esenler Erokspor.

Career

On 28 June 2016, Deliktaş joined Kardemir Karabükspor on a two-year contract.

References

External links
 
 

1986 births
People from Elazığ
Living people
Turkish footballers
Association football forwards
Kahramanmaraşspor footballers
Gaskispor footballers
Gaziantep F.K. footballers
Alanyaspor footballers
Ankaraspor footballers
Kardemir Karabükspor footballers
Altınordu F.K. players
Manisa FK footballers
Pendikspor footballers
Süper Lig players
TFF First League players
TFF Second League players